Stephen Lang (born July 11, 1952) is an American actor. He is known for roles in films such as Manhunter (1986), Gettysburg, Tombstone (both 1993), Gods and Generals (2003), Public Enemies, The Men Who Stare at Goats (both 2009), Conan the Barbarian (2011) and Don't Breathe (2016). Outside of these roles, he has had an extensive career on Broadway, and has received a Tony Award nomination for his role in the 1992 production of The Speed of Darkness. He won the Saturn Award for Best Supporting Actor for his performance in James Cameron's Avatar (2009). From 2004 to 2006, he was co-artistic director of the Actors Studio.

Early life 
Lang was born in New York City, the youngest child of Theresa (née Volmar, d. 2008) and Eugene Lang (1919–2017), a prominent entrepreneur and philanthropist. Lang's mother was Catholic of German and Irish descent, while his father was Jewish. Lang's paternal grandparents were Jewish emigrants from Hungary and Russia. He has two elder siblings—Jane, an attorney and activist, and David, who served as an executive at REFAC, the company their father founded in 1952. Lang's father donated much of his net worth (in excess of $150 million) to charity and did not leave an inheritance to his children, believing they each needed to learn to become self-sufficient.

Lang attended elementary school in Jamaica Estates, Queens. His middle school was a New York City public school, George Ryan Junior High School, in nearby Fresh Meadows. For high school, he attended George School, a Quaker boarding school in Newtown, PA and graduated from there a year early (1969). He graduated from Swarthmore College in 1973 with a degree in English Literature.

Career 

Lang played Harold (Happy) Loman in the 1984 Broadway revival of Death of a Salesman and the 1985 television film with Dustin Hoffman as Willy Loman, and appeared in the first Hannibal Lecter film Manhunter (1986), as reporter Freddy Lounds. He played attorney David Abrams in the television series Crime Story (1986–1988). He played the title role in the NBC movie Babe Ruth (1991). He later played the "One Armed Man" in The Fugitive, the 2000 revival starring Tim Daly. The series was a modest success but lasted only one season because of its large production budget.

In 1992, he was nominated for a Tony Award for his lead role in The Speed of Darkness. His film role in Last Exit to Brooklyn (1989) garnered him widespread critical acclaim, but its limited release prevented the film from reaching a wider audience. On stage, he was the first to play the role of Colonel Nathan Jessup in A Few Good Men, a role made famous on film (1992) by Jack Nicholson. He is the winner of over half a dozen theatre awards including the Drama Desk and Helen Hayes awards.

In films, he played Maj. Gen. George E. Pickett in Gettysburg (1993) and the lead role of Thomas "Stonewall" Jackson in the Gettysburg prequel Gods and Generals (2003), both from director Ronald F. Maxwell. His interest in the Civil War has prompted him to perform at symposia of The Lincoln Forum, which, in 2020, presented him with its Richard Nelson Current Award of Achievement.

Shortly before Arthur Miller's death in February 2005, Lang appeared in his long-time friend's last play, titled Finishing the Picture. It premiered in 2004 at Chicago's Goodman Theatre, where Lang had the second run of his own play, Beyond Glory, which had premiered in Arlington, Virginia, early in 2004, and his Tony-nominated portrayal for The Speed of Darkness. Lang also performed Beyond Glory, a one-man show, for troops deployed overseas. In 2006, he played the role of Colonel Littlefield in John Patrick Shanley's play Defiance. He brought Beyond Glory to Roundabout's Off-Broadway Laura Pels Theatre in 2007. Since its New York City premiere, Beyond Glory has been nominated for a Drama Desk Award and a Lucille Lortel Award both for outstanding solo performance. A movie about the play has been produced and released.

Lang has a role in the ESPN miniseries The Bronx Is Burning, as well as roles in independent features Save Me and From Mexico with Love. He plays a lead role in James Cameron's sci-fi epic Avatar as the villainous Colonel Miles Quaritch.

In 2009, he appeared in Michael Mann's film Public Enemies as FBI Agent Charles Winstead, the man widely considered to have fired the shots that killed John Dillinger, and in Grant Heslov's The Men Who Stare at Goats alongside Jeff Bridges, Kevin Spacey, Ewan McGregor, and George Clooney.

Also in 2009, he narrated the audiobook Road Rage—which combines the short stories "Duel" by Richard Matheson and "Throttle" by Stephen King and Joe Hill—and guest-starred in the Law & Order: Criminal Intent season 8 finales, "Revolution" in the role of Axel Kaspers. In 2010 he performed the narration for "The Gettysburg Story: Battlefield Auto Tour," the top-selling audio tour of the Gettysburg Battlefield at Gettysburg National Military Park in Gettysburg, Pennsylvania. Written and produced by filmmaker Jake Boritt and based on works by historian Gabor Boritt it tells the story of the Battle of Gettysburg and Abraham Lincoln's Gettysburg Address in Gettysburg National Cemetery. Lang is also the narrator of the companion public television documentary The Gettysburg Story presented by Maryland Public Television.

Lang played the villain Khalar Zym in the 2011 Conan the Barbarian reboot starring Jason Momoa. He also played one of the leads, Nathaniel Taylor, in the Steven Spielberg-produced TV series Terra Nova.

In February 2012, he signed on to play Mary Shannon's estranged father in a three-episode arc on the final season of the USA television series In Plain Sight.

In 2013, Lang appeared in The Monkey's Paw for Chiller TV.

Lang has been confirmed as reprising his role as Colonel Miles Quaritch in the upcoming sequels to Avatar.

He plays Increase Mather, in a recurring role, on WGN America's first original scripted series, Salem.

Lang is part of the cast of AMC's martial-arts drama Into the Badlands. He played The Blind Man in Fede Álvarez's hit horror-thriller Don't Breathe (2016), which received positive reviews. He reprised the role in the sequel Don't Breathe 2 in 2021.

In February 2016, Lang lobbied for the role Cable in Deadpool 2 through captioned Twitter pictures. The role ultimately went to Josh Brolin. In 2017, he played Colonel Abraham Biggs in Hostiles, from director Scott Cooper. In 2018, he appeared as father of Joe Braven (Jason Momoa), Linden Braven in the action thriller film Braven, and played Shrike in Mortal Engines, which Peter Jackson produced for Universal Pictures and Media Rights Capital.

Personal life 

He has been married to Kristina Watson since 1980, and together they have four children, including New York State Inspector General Lucy Lang.

On May 30, 2010, Swarthmore awarded him an honorary degree in recognition of his career in theatre, television, and film. His youngest son, Noah, received his bachelor's degree during the same ceremony. He also holds an Honorary Doctorate in Humane Letters from Jacksonville University and was an artist in residence at Northeastern University in 2011.

In the fall of 2015, Lang served as a Jury Member for the Woodstock Film Festival.

Filmography

Film

Television

Radio

Web

Video games

Awards and nominations

References

External links 

 
 
 
 Interview on Beyond Glory at the Pritzker Military Museum & Library
 

1952 births
American Ashkenazi Jews
Male actors from New York City
American male film actors
American male television actors
American male voice actors
American male stage actors
American people of German descent
American people of Hungarian-Jewish descent
American people of Russian-Jewish descent
American people of Irish descent
Living people
Swarthmore College alumni
Jewish American male actors
George School alumni
Audiobook narrators
21st-century American Jews